Vivienne Mary Hunt Parry  (born Vivienne Mary Hunt Mills on 4 June 1956 in Portsmouth) is a British science journalist and author, currently employed as head of engagement at Genomics England. She is most well known for presenting BBC Television science programme Tomorrow's World and Panorama. She is also a regular contributor to The Guardian newspaper's online presence.

Early life
Parry was educated at St Swithun's School, Winchester, an independent girls' school. She studied Zoology at Bedford College, London graduating with a Bachelor of Science degree in 1978, majoring in immunology and genetics which she took at University College London.

Career
Her first job was as National Organiser of the mother and baby charity Birthright, the appeal arm of the Royal College of Obstetricians and Gynaecologists from 1979 to 1994. She worked closely with the charity's Patron, the Princess of Wales, for 12 years.

She briefly served as a trustee of the Princess of Wales Memorial Fund.

She also served as vice chairman of council of University College London and was also a member of Council of the Medical Research Council since 2009. In September 2017, she was appointed to the board of UK Research and Innovation (UKRI).

In 1994, she became a presenter of the BBC TV science programme Tomorrow's World and also reported for Panorama. She left the programme in 1997.

Parry has presented a number of science-based radio shows, including most notably all eight series of Am I normal?  and Inside the Ethics Committee. She also presents and writes many other radio programs, including programs for the BBC World Service and BBC Radio 3.

Publications
Her book The Truth About Hormones, published in January 2009, was nominated for the 2006 Aventis Science Prize, now called the Royal Society Prizes for Science Books. Other publications include:
 The Truth About Hormones
 The Real Pregnancy Guide

Awards and honours
Parry received an Honorary Doctorate from Heriot-Watt University in 2012  She won the Suffrage Science award in 2011.

Parry was appointed Officer of the Order of the British Empire (OBE) in the 2011 New Year Honours for services to the public understanding of science.

Personal life
She married Paul Parry in 1978 in Hampshire. They divorced in 2007 and have two sons. She married Tim Joss in 2012.

References

Alumni of University College London
BBC science journalists
British science journalists
The Times people
The Guardian journalists
News of the World people
People educated at St Swithun's School, Winchester
1956 births
Living people
Officers of the Order of the British Empire
Writers from Portsmouth
Women science writers
British women television journalists
British radio presenters
British women radio presenters